Nebil Özgentürk (born 1959 in Adana), is a Turkish writer, journalist and director of documentaries.

Özgentürk who is the brother of director Ali Özgentürkgraduated from the Ege Üniversitesi Faculty of Management in 1981. He started journalism as a correspondent for the Günaydın newspapers' İzmir office.  Later he changed to the Sabah newspaper in Istanbul. He was a war correspondent in Romania, Abhkazia and the time of the Gulf War.

In 1992, he started started to prepare short documentaries named "Bir İnsan Bir Hayat" which stemmed from the weekly portrait reports he did at the Sabah newspaper. This idea initiated from his book Bir Yudum İnsan. In later years he produced many documentaries. The program named Bir Yudum İnsan which he started in 1994 on ATV and later moved to CNN Türk covered the portraits of known names in art, sports and politics with an emphasis on the lesser known facts and aspects about their lives.

Özgentürk is married and has three children.

Filmography 
 Bir Doğum Günü Armağanı – 1998
 Bir Yudum İnsan – 1999–2007 (380 bölüm)
 Rüzgara Karşı Yürüyenler – 2002 (10 bölüm)
 Cumhuriyet Kuşağından 2000'lere Ses – 2002
 Türk Sinemasında İETT Serüveni: Yeşilçam'ın "Yol"culuğu... "Yol"culuğun Yeşilçam'ı – 2003
 Yaşamdan Dakikalar (With Hıncal Uluç, Haşmet Babaoğlu and Kenan Onuk) – 2004
 Konuşan Yeşilçam – 2004–2005 (30 episodes)
 Olimpiyatlar: Atina'dan Pekin'e Uzun İnce Bir Yol – 2006
 Orhan Pamuk: Anılar ve Nobel – 2007
 Basının Kısa Tarihi – 2007 (3 episodes)
 Türkiye’nin Hatıra Defteri – 2007 (14 episodes)
 Yargılardan Türkülere: Ankara Adliyesinin Yıllara Uzanan Öyküsü – 2009
 Anka Kuşu’nun İzinde (İstanbul Kız Lisesi’nin Asırlık Öyküsü) – 2010
 Sanatımızın Hatıra Defteri – 2013 (16 episodes)
 Venüs’ün Seyri (Sinemamızın ve Altın Portakal’ın 50 Yılı) – 2013
 Asırlık Yüzler – 2014 (6 episodes)
 Çağdaşlık İçin Çeyrek Asır – 2014
 Ataol’a Dair (Ataol Behramoğlu) – 2015
 Biz Kültür Yolcuları – 2015 (10 episodes)
 Ali Ekber Çiçek'in Öyküsü – 2015
 Osmanlı’dan Cumhuriyet’e At Sevdası – 2016
 Bir Kent Hikâyesi: Adana – 2016
 Toprak – 2016
 Bilimin Sonsuzluğunda Bir Yaşam: Aziz Sancar – 2016
 İçinden Hüzün Geçen Sevdalar – 2017
 Efsane Aslanlar – 2017 (13 episodes)
 Dersim’in Dersi-Kırık Bir Şehir Hikâyesi – 2017
 Bi'çaresizlikten Bi'çareye – 2017
 Almanya’ya Göçün Hatıra Defteri – 2017 (7 bölüm)
 Gazinin Son Tanıkları Anlatıyor
 Uzay Heparı
 Kenan Sofuoğlu
 Serhan Şeşen
 Zeki Ökten
 Ve Yaşamdan Dakikalar

Corporate documentaries 
 Bir Yudum Türkiye
 İlk Durak: İstanbul'un Entelektüel Tarihinden Tanıklıklar (with Can Dündar)
 Güleryüzlü Bir İzmir Şarkısı – 2005
 Olimpiyat: Atina'dan Pekin'e Uzun İnce Bir Yol – 2006
 Ducumentary of Istanbul University– 2006
 Bir Adana Masalı – 2007
 Cumhuriyet'in Kanatlarında Bir Girişimci: Asım Bey – 2010
 Sanayinin Sonsuz Işığında (Produced by the Istanbul Chamber of Industry) – 2017 (6 episodes)
 Balık Belgeseli
 Eczacıbaşı
 Istanbul Girls High School 
 Markalar Şehri Bursa
 İzmir Fair Documentary
 YTONG'la Örülen Yıllar

Works 
 Türkiye'nin Hatıra Defteri 1924'ten Günümüze, DenizBank Publications, 2009
 Babayani, Kara Karga Publishers, 2017
 Daima Işık, Kara Karga Publishers, 2018
 Sessiz Gece Yazıları, Kara Karga Publishers, 2018
 Galatasaray Tarihi ve Efsaneleri, Doğan Kitap, 2018
 Masumiyet Çağı İnsanları: Cumhuriyet Yıllarından Özel Hatıralar, Bir Yudum İnsan Publishing House, 2019
 Filmlerle Geçtim Sokağınızdan, Kara Karga Publishers, 2020

Major awards 
 Türkiye Gazetecilik Başarı Ödülü Onur Belgesi- Journalist of the Year in the Report Branch 1994
 Türkiye Gazetecilik Cemiyeti Türkiye Gazetecilik Başarı Ödülleri "TV-Kültür-Sanat-Magazin" 2005
 Contemporary Journalists Association Mahmut Tali Öngören Award 2008
 38. Golden Butterfly Award for Best Contemporary Culture and Art Program for "Yaşamdan Dakikalar"
 Sedat Simavi Award for "Sanatımızın Hatıra Defteri" 2013

External links

References 

Living people
1965 births
Turkish journalists
People from Adana
21st-century Turkish writers
20th-century Turkish writers
Turkish directors
War correspondents